Kelkel-e Abbasabad (also Romanized as Kelkel-e ‘Abbāsābād; also known as ‘Abbāsābād and Golgol ‘Abbāsābād) is a village in Dana Rural District, in the Central District of Dana County, Kohgiluyeh and Boyer-Ahmad Province, Iran. At the 2006 census, its population was 602, in 145 families.

References 

Populated places in Dana County